San Sebastián Bernal, better known as Bernal (from Basque Vernal, "place of stones or boulders"), is a colonial village in the Mexican state of Querétaro. It was founded in 1642 by Spanish soldier Alonso Cabrera.

Bernal is located 40 minutes by road from state capital Santiago de Querétaro and two and a half hours from Mexico City.
It is located in Ezequiel Montes municipality, a few minutes from Colón and Cadereyta.

It has a current population of 2909, of which 1377 are males and 1532 are females. A total of 1014 persons are counted as Economic Active Population and there are only 630 inhabited homes in town.

It is known for its enormous monolith of massive rock, the Peña de Bernal, the third highest on the planet.

According to chronicler Omar Ortega Paz, its names in the Otomi language (De'hendo) and in Chichimeca (Ma'hando) have the same meaning: “In the middle of two”.

In 2005, Bernal was designated a Pueblo Mágico ("Magical Town") by the Mexican Secretariat of Tourism (SECTUR). The Magical Towns are admitted for being localities that have magic symbolic attributes, legends, history, transcendental facts that associate in each of its cultural manifestations, and that today mean a great opportunity for tourism.

Climate

See also
Bernal - Estado de Querétaro photo gallery.

References 

Populated places in Querétaro
Pueblos Mágicos
Otomi settlements